Paul Peter Rhode (September 18, 1871 – March 3, 1945) was a German-born prelate of the Roman Catholic Church. He served as bishop of the Diocese of Green Bay in Wisconsin from 1915 until his death in 1945.

Rhode was the first Pole and Kashubian to be elevated to an American bishopric.

Biography

Early life and education
Paul Rhode was born in Neustadt in the Kingdom of Prussia, German Empire (now part of Poland) to Augustin and Krystyna Rhode. Augustin died in Prussia while Paul Rhode was a young boy.  When he was age nine, his family immigrated to the United States in the Kashubian diaspora, settling in Chicago, Illinois. 

Rhode was first educated at St. Mary's College in Hardin's Creek, Kentucky.  He then attended St. Ignatius College in Chicago, where he completed his classical and philosophical studies. Rhode completed his theological studies at St. Francis Seminary in St. Francis, Wisconsin.

Ordination and ministry
Rhode was ordained to the priesthood for the Archdiocese of Chicago by Bishop Frederick Katzer on June 17, 1894. His first assignment was as a curate at St. Adalbert Parish in Chicago, where he remained for two years. In 1896, Rhode was appointed as the first pastor of SS. Peter and Paul, a parish for Polish Catholics in the McKinley Park section of Chicago. He was named pastor of St. Michael Parish in South Chicago in 1897.

Auxiliary Bishop of Chicago
On May 22, 1908, Rhode was appointed auxiliary bishop of the Archdiocese of Chicago and titular bishop of Barca by Pope Pius X. Since he was the first Pole in America to be named a bishop, this occasion was celebrated with special joy by the Polish American community. He received his episcopal consecration on July 29, 1908, from Archbishop James Edward Quigley, with Bishops Peter Muldoon and Joseph Koudelka serving as co-consecrators. He served as vicar general of the archdiocesae from 1909 to 1915.

Bishop of Green Bay
Following the resignation of Bishop Joseph J. Fox, Rhode was appointed the sixth bishop of the Diocese of Green Bay by Pope Benedict XV on July 15, 1915. During his tenure, he established 10 parishes and 19 parochial schools, and organized the diocesan Catholic Charities and a department of education. 

Paul Rhode died at Mercy Hospital in Oshkosh, Wisconsin, on March 3, 1945, at age 73.

See also

 Catholic Church hierarchy
 Catholic Church in the United States
 Historical list of the Catholic bishops of the United States
 List of Catholic bishops of the United States
 Lists of patriarchs, archbishops, and bishops

Notes

External links

 Roman Catholic Archdiocese of Chicago
 Roman Catholic Diocese of Green Bay

1871 births
1945 deaths
20th-century Roman Catholic bishops in the United States
American people of Kashubian descent
Kashubian clergy
Loyola University Chicago alumni
People from the Province of Prussia
People from Wejherowo
Polish emigrants to the United States
Roman Catholic Archdiocese of Chicago
Roman Catholic bishops of Green Bay
St. Francis Seminary (Wisconsin) alumni